Zoltán Pál Dienes (anglicized as Zoltan Paul Dienes) (June 21, 1916 – January 11, 2014) was a Hungarian mathematician whose ideas on education (especially of small children) have been popular in some countries.
He was a world-famous theorist and tireless practitioner of the "new mathematics": an approach to mathematics learning that uses games, songs, and dance to make it more appealing to children. He is credited with the creation of Base ten blocks, popularly referred to as Dienes blocks.

Dienes's life and ideas are described in his autobiography, Memoirs of a Maverick Mathematician, and his book of mathematical games, I Will Tell You Algebra Stories You've Never Heard Before. He has also published a book of poetry, Calls from the Past.

His later life contributions have been chronicled by Bharath Sriraman in the second monograph of The Montana Mathematics Enthusiast.

References

 Conese, Antonio, (2016). L'insegnamento della matematica, IlMioLibro, Gruppo Editoriale L'Espresso,

External links

Hungarian educators
1916 births
20th-century Hungarian mathematicians
2014 deaths
20th-century Hungarian poets